Presidential elections were held in El Salvador on 16 February 1846. Eugenio Aguilar ran unopposed and was elected by the legislature.

Results

References

El Salvador
1846 in El Salvador
Election and referendum articles with incomplete results
Presidential elections in El Salvador
Single-candidate elections